Elections in Mizoram have been conducted since 1972 to elect members of  the Mizoram Legislative Assembly and Lok Sabha. There are 40 assembly constituencies and 1 Lok Sabha constituency.

Legislative Assembly elections
The elections for the Mizoram Legislative Assembly began in 1972.

Lok Sabha elections 
The elections for the Lok Sabha held since 1971.

References